Eva Elisabeth Børresen (29 November 1920 – 3 September 2022) was a Norwegian ceramist. 

Born in Berlin, she studied under sculptor  at the State Academy of Fine Arts Stuttgart from 1937 to 1939. She married carpenter Runar Børresen in 1939, and they settled in Norway, first in Lillehammer. She established a ceramic workshop in Oslo in 1942, and moved to Trondheim in 1946. She was awarded a gold medal at the Milan Triennial in 1954. The family eventually moved to Bergen and later to Fredrikstad. She died in Fredrikstad on 3 September 2022. 

Børresen is represented at the National Museum of Art, Architecture and Design.

References

1920 births
2022 deaths
People from Berlin
German emigrants to Norway
Norwegian ceramists
Norwegian centenarians